The Saint was a radio adventure program in the United States that featured a character ("a swashbuckling, devil-may-care [wikt] Robin Hood type who, in his attempt to help people, remained just one step ahead of the police and crooks—both of whom he combatted") created by author Leslie Charteris. As the program's introduction said, The Saint (the alias of Simon Templar), was "known to millions from books, magazines, and motion pictures." Several versions of the program appeared on different networks.

Broadcast history
The Saint began its life on radio in January 1945. Most old time radio reference books list the initial broadcast date as January 6, 1945, probably because that was when the program aired in the Eastern United States. In an initial story about The Saint, however, Billboard reported, "Series tees-off over NBC January 4 on 7 Western stations, with a repeat skedded  for Saturday to hit 15 Midwestern and Eastern stations at 7:30 p.m. EWT." That Saturday was January 6. The article noted the involvement of the character's creator, saying: "All scripting will be under the supervision of Charteris, who will oversee the adaptations of his published works. If any originals are to be done, he'll do them." Edgar Barrier starred, and Bromo-Seltzer was the sponsor. This version ended March 31, 1945.

The second iteration of The Saint on radio was a summer replacement for The Jack Carson Show on CBS. It began June 20, 1945, with Billboard reporting in a preview article, "There's nothing definite now, but it's expected here that if The Saint pulls an acceptable Hooperating for its 13-week spin, starting June 20, it may stay on the air permanently with Carson out ..." Despite that prediction, the program went off when its summer run ended September 12, 1945. Brian Aherne starred, and Campbell Soups was the sponsor.

The show's third version, which began July 9, 1947, was limited to CBS' West Coast network. It ended June 30, 1948. The sponsor was Lever Brothers. Vincent Price starred in this version and in most of the show's episodes in the two versions that followed.

After a year's hiatus, The Saint returned to radio July 10, 1949—this time on Mutual. An announcement in Billboard noted that the program would be sustaining (without a sponsor), but that Mutual "will use trial summer run to showcase show for fall bankrolling." The bankrolling eventually came from Ford Motor Company, and the show lasted through May 28, 1950.

The program's final run began June 11, 1950, as a summer replacement for The Phil Harris-Alice Faye Show. The Saint was back on its original network, NBC, for this version, which ended October 14, 1951. The show lasted longer in this version than in any other, despite a negative review of the first episode in Billboard which said much of the script was "confusing and slow-paced" and called star Vincent Price "frightfully dull."

The title role was also played briefly by Tom Conway (whose brother, George Sanders, had played Simon Templar in several films), and Barry Sullivan. Louise Arthur played Patricia Holm, Templar's assistant. Lawrence Dobkin played Louie, the cab driver. John Brown played Inspector Fernack, and Ken Christy played Hoppy, Templar's sidekick.

Other versions
Besides the versions broadcast in the United States, a six-episode version was broadcast in Ireland in 1940, and a three-episode version was broadcast by the BBC in 1995.

References

External links 
 91 episodes of The Saint available by streaming from Archive.org
 Jerry Haendiges Vintage Radio Logs: The Saint
 The Digital Deli Too: The Saint Episodic Log
 Scripts for two episodes of The Saint from Old Time Radio Researchers Group

1940s American radio programs
1950s American radio programs
American radio dramas
CBS Radio programs
Mutual Broadcasting System programs
The Saint (Simon Templar)
NBC radio programs
Detective radio shows
1945 radio programme debuts
1951 radio programme endings
Radio programmes based on novels